Wilton "Scoop" Putnam (September 8, 1912 – June 8, 1996) was an American professional basketball player. He played in the National Basketball League for the Oshkosh All-Stars and Toledo Jim White Chevrolets and averaged 3.9 points per game for his career.

References 

1912 births
1996 deaths
American men's basketball players
United States Army personnel of World War II
Basketball players from South Carolina
Forwards (basketball)
Guards (basketball)
Oshkosh All-Stars players
Sportspeople from Greenville, South Carolina
Tennessee Volunteers basketball players
Toledo Jim White Chevrolets players